Edelin (died 1293) ruled over the Alsatian abbey of Weissenburg as its abbot from the year 1262 until his death on 15 October 1293. He is also recognized as an architect and was credited for building the Gothic abbey church of the monastery, which still stands today. He also oversaw the construction of a refectory and the subterranean furnaces to warm the monastery. 

Because the monastery had had the majority of its possessions confiscated since the 10th century, Edelin had an inventory of estates prepared, using older documents, called the Codex Edelini or Liber Possessionum, in order to index the existing estate and prevent further losses (which, as it turned out, was not successful).

References

Benedictine abbots
French Benedictines
13th-century births
1293 deaths
Year of birth unknown